The Catch was a rock band from Seattle, Washington. Formed by Carly Nicklaus (U.S.E), Amy Rockwell (Dolour, U.S.E), Jenny Jimenez on bass guitar and Alissa Newton on drums  The group released their first album Get Cool on Made In Mexico Records in May 2005. Jimenez and Newton later left the group, to be replaced by Shane Berry and Garrett Lunceford of The Divorce. Justin Harcus later replaced Berry.

Members
Carly Nicklaus – guitar, lead vocals
Amy Rockwell – keyboards, backup vocals
Justin Harcus – bass
Garrett Lunceford – drums

Past members
Laura Mott – keyboards
Amanda Findley – Bass
Jenny Jimenez – bass
Alissa Newton – drums
Shane Berry – bass

Discography
Get Cool (Made In Mexico, 2005)
Fall Down Laughing (Tidemark, 2007)

References

External links
 

Rock music groups from Washington (state)
Musical groups from Seattle